Masculinities without Men? is a book by Jean Bobby Noble.

Summary
Noble explores how the construction of gender was thrown into crisis during the twentieth-century, resulting in a permanent rupture in the sex/gender system, and how masculinity became an unstable category, altered across time, region, social class, and ethnicity. Noble demonstrates that transgender and transsexual masculinity began to emerge as a unique category in late twentieth-century fiction, distinct from lesbian or female masculinity.

Reception
Masculinities without Men? has gotten some significant scholarly notice. However, reviews of the book have been mixed.

References

See also
List of transgender-related topics

Gender studies literature
Sociology books
Transgender non-fiction books
Men's studies literature